María Isabel López Rodríguez (born 4 January 1995), known professionally as María Isabel, is a Spanish singer and songwriter. She is best known for winning the Junior Eurovision Song Contest 2004 with the song "Antes muerta que sencilla".

Biography

María Isabel was born in Ayamonte, Province of Huelva, Spain. She demonstrated an interest in dancing and singing from a very young age. Her love for singing and dancing took her to the 2004 Spanish Eurojunior competition, which was televised nationally in her native Spain. The purpose of this competition was to select Spain's representative for the relatively new Junior Eurovision Song Contest competition, which began in 2003.

Eurojunior and Junior Eurovision Song Contest
María Isabel won Spain's Eurojunior contest with her single "Antes muerta que sencilla" ("I'd rather be dead than understated"). Subsequently, she won the second Junior Eurovision Song Contest performing the same song, and setting a record for both largest score (171 points) and largest winning margin (31). Her largest score record was broken by 2015 winner, Destiny Chukunyere. Her winning margin record was broken by the 2012 winner, Anastasiya Petryk, who won with a 35-point margin.

Winning at the age of nine years, ten months and 16 days old, she became the youngest person to win the contest to date (a few days younger than the Tolmachevy Sisters, the only other nine year-old winners).

Several weeks before winning the festival she released her first album, titled ¡No me toques las palmas que me conozco! ("Don't clap your hands because I know myself"). This CD included "Antes muerta que sencilla", which launched her career in the Spanish show business world, making her a competitor of another Spaniard child star, Melody.

After Junior Eurovision Song Contest

"Antes Muerta que Sencilla" became an instant radio hit in Spain, and was later promoted in Latin America, where María Isabel's album was released in 2005. Milly Cangiano, a Puerto Rican television show host, made the song's title one of the catchphrases she uses daily during her show.

In addition, María Isabel began her first tour of Latin America and the United States after the album's release. Her song became a chart-topper in Argentina, Colombia, and Puerto Rico, among others. In April 2005, she was interviewed on US nationwide television for the first time, when she was presented on Univision's El Gordo y la Flaca and chatted with hosts Lili Estefan and Raúl De Molina.

María Isabel continued school, but on weekends and school holidays she would travel throughout Spain giving concerts as well as interviews for the media. She became a regular performer on Málaga's Tivoli World amusement park.

Her second album was titled Número 2. It includes the songs "Pues va a ser que no" and "En mi jardín". These songs are part of the Spanish soundtrack of the Barbie film Barbie and the Magic of Pegasus. Her third album, Capricornio, was released on 21 November 2006 and peaked at number 11 on the Spanish Albums Chart. It is a double disc set which also includes a DVD with all of her videoclips and extras.

Her fourth studio album is a collection of songs from the soundtrack of the first movie she starred in, Ángeles SA. Due to management and release problems, Ángeles SA entered the Spanish charts at number 35, however it later peaked at number 7, certifying it gold.

In 2009 and 2010 she hosted the children's show Los Lunnis on Televisión Española. In November 2009 she released her fifth album, Los Lunnis con María Isabel, which contained the songs from the show as well as two original tracks.

Career as an adult
After a career hiatus in order to finish her studies, María Isabel returned to music in 2015, eleven years after her debut, with her sixth studio album, Yo Decido.

On 29 December 2015, María Isabel was announced as one of the six candidates to represent Spain in the Eurovision Song Contest 2016. She took part in the televised national final organised by Televisión Española with a song composed by David Santisteban and titled “La vida sólo es una”, the first single from Yo Decido. She came 4th with 68 points.

On 5 July 2019, María Isabel released a single titled "Tu Mirada".

Personal life 
Isabel is engaged to Jesús Marchena, with whom she has a daughter, Daliana (born 14 February 2023).

Discography

Albums

Singles 
 2004: “Antes muerta que sencilla” — #36 BEL, #8 CH, #6 FR, #1 SP
 2004: “¡No Me Toques Las Palmas Que Me Conozco!” — #2 SP
 2004: “La vida es bella” — #8 SP
 2005: “Pues va a ser que no” — #1 SP
 2006: “En mi jardín (Hope Has Wings)” — #6 SP Is Brie Larson's Cover from Barbie & The Magic of Pegasus
 2006: “Quién da la vez” — promo only
 2006: “De qué vas” — #56 SP
 2007: “Cometas de cristal” — promo only
 2007: “Cuando no estás”
 2009: “Cosquillitas”
 2015: “La Vida Sólo Es Una”
 2019: “Tu mirada”
 2019: “Flamenkita”
 2020: “Esa Carita” with Juan Magán

Filmography

References 

1995 births
Living people
People from the Province of Huelva
Junior Eurovision Song Contest entrants
Junior Eurovision Song Contest winners
Spanish child singers
Singers from Andalusia
21st-century Spanish singers
21st-century Spanish women singers